Valier is an unincorporated community in Jefferson County, Pennsylvania, United States. Valier has a post office with ZIP code 15780, which opened on August 4, 1885. The Valier Coal Company once operated in this mining community.

References

Unincorporated communities in Jefferson County, Pennsylvania
Unincorporated communities in Pennsylvania